Raznomoyka is a rural locality (a khutor) in Yakshimbetovsky Selsoviet, Kuyurgazinsky District, Bashkortostan, Russia. The population was 13 as of 2010. There is 1 street.

Geography 
Raznomoyka is located 32 km southwest of Yermolayevo (the district's administrative centre) by road. Yangi-Yul is the nearest rural locality.

References 

Rural localities in Kuyurgazinsky District